The 1984 Cork Junior A Hurling Championship was the 87th staging of the Cork Junior A Hurling Championship since its establishment by the Cork County Board. The championship began on 30 September 1984 and ended on 25 November 1984.

On 25 November 1984, Midleton won the championship following a 3–14 to 2–12 defeat of Kilbrittain in the final. It was their third championship title overall and their first title since 1945.

Qualification

Results

Quarter-final

Semi-finals

Final

Championship statistics

Top scorers

Overall

In a single game

References

1984 in hurling
Cork Junior Hurling Championship